The Theoretical Issues in Ergonomics Science (TIES) journal is an interdisciplinary  peer-reviewed academic journal covering research in human factors and ergonomics. Unlike other ergonomics journals that deal primarily with applications, TIES focuses on theoretical aspects of the science. The journal was established in 2000 and is published by Taylor & Francis. The co-editors are Waldemar Karwowski (University of Central Florida) and Dylan Schmorrow (Chief Scientist, Soar Technology). TIES publishes 6 issues per year, and it is affiliated with the International Conference on Applied Human Factors and Ergonomics.

Abstracting and indexing 
The journal is abstracted and indexed in:
 British Library Inside 
 Cambridge Scientific Abstracts
 EBSCO Databases
 Electronic Collections Online
 Ergonomics Abstracts
 New Jour
 Occupational Safety and Health Database
 OCLC ArticleFirst
 PsycFIRST
 PsycINFO 
 Zetoc

References

External links 
 

Computer science journals
Taylor & Francis academic journals
English-language journals
Publications established in 2000
Bimonthly journals